Trefil is a small village in the county borough of Blaenau Gwent, south Wales.  It lies at the top of the Sirhowy Valley, near to Brecon Beacons National Park. It is three miles northwest of Tredegar. With one public house, The Top House, serving homemade food and drinks to local visitors.

Etymology 
The village name may derive from the terms 'tref' and 'mil' signifying the 'farm of the lesser celandine', a plant which might be expected to grow in the stream which flows through the place, the Nant Trefil.

Geography 
The village is sited in the bottom of a broad valley which cuts through the moorlands between the Heads of the Valleys Road and the Dyffryn Crawnon valley to the north. Trefil is served by a single cul-de-sac road which leaves the A465 Heads of the Valleys Road 1.5 miles to the south. The boundary of the Brecon Beacons National Park lies one mile to the north of the village. It is described by some as Wales' highest village.

Trefil is perhaps best known for its limestone quarries – a major one immediately north of the village is operational whilst Cwar yr Ystrad, Cwar yr Hendre and Cwar Blaen-dyffryn to the west and northwest are no longer operational. The Trefil Tramroad and the Sirhowy Tramroad formerly linked the quarries with the heavily industrialised areas to the south, providing limestone for the furnaces. The former Brinore Tramroad connected the quarries at Trefil with the Monmouthshire and Brecon Canal at Talybont in the Usk Valley to the north.

Open moorland rises to east and west of the village, the slopes to the west being known as Trefil Ddu and those to the east as Trefil Las. The moorland of Mynydd Llangynidr to the east undulates considerably and contains a number of caves beneath its surface. Most famous amongst these is Chartist's Cave one mile to the northeast of the village.

Nature 
Trefil Quarries and Trefil Ddu are noted birdwatching sites; this area is the last remaining site in Gwent where ring ouzel occurs regularly, and other species present include raven, wheatear, stonechat, whinchat, snipe and red grouse.

Arts and entertainment
The BBC TV series Merlin filmed many episodes at Trefil quarry and the feature film Wrath of the Titans was filmed there in June 2011.

Sports 
The village is the site of Trefile Rugby Welfare Club who play in WRU Division 3C East. Of particular note is the derby between Trefil and Tredegar which is traditionally a strongly contested affair.

Transport 
The nearby town of Nantybwch is a 44-minute walk from the village and is the location of bus services:

 97 (Ebbw Vale-Peacehaven)
 20 (Tredegar to Rhymney)

Rhymney railway station is 60 minutes from the village by bus from Nantybwch. Nantybwch is the historic site of the now closed Nantybwch railway station.

Politics 
The village is represented under the ward of Sirhowy and its councillors are Brian Thomas (Ind, Sirhowy), Malcolm Cross (Lab, Sirhowy), and Tommy Smith (Lab, Sirhowy).

The area is represented in the Senedd by Alun Davies (Labour) and the Member of Parliament is Nick Smith (Labour).

References

External links
 Images of Trefil and surrounding area from Geograph website
Trefil at Industrial Gwent heritage website

Villages in Blaenau Gwent
Tredegar